Ichinsky ( or Ичинская сопка, Ichinskaya sopka) is a large stratovolcano located in the central part of the Kamchatka Peninsula, Russia. At , it is the highest peak of the Sredinny Range, the central range of the peninsula.

The volcano is capped by a  summit caldera, within which rise two lava domes which are the highest peaks. The entire summit area is covered by a substantial ice cap, and several large glaciers descend the flanks of the cone. There is ongoing fumarolic activity within the caldera.

A dozen more dacite and rhyodacite lava domes are found on the flanks of the volcano below the caldera rim.

See also
 List of volcanoes in Russia
 List of ultras of Northeast Asia

References 

Sources
 
 Institute of Volcanology and Seismology, Kamchatka: Ichinsky
  (in Russian, with brief English summaries)
  (in Russian, with English summaries)

Mountains of the Kamchatka Peninsula
Volcanoes of the Kamchatka Peninsula
Calderas of Russia
Stratovolcanoes of Russia
Holocene stratovolcanoes
Holocene Asia
Pleistocene stratovolcanoes